Bayport is a hamlet and census-designated place (CDP) in the Town of Islip, Suffolk County, New York, United States, on Long Island. The population was 8,609 at the 2020 census.

Bayport is in the southeast part of the Town of Islip.

Geography
The community borders the Great South Bay, Sayville and the hamlet of Blue Point.

Bayport is located at  (40.747858, -73.054216).

Demographics

Demographics for the CDP
As of the census of 2000, there were 8,662 people, 3,222 households, and 2,303 families residing in the CDP. The population density was 2,332.8 per square mile (901.5/km2). There were 3,325 housing units at an average density of 895.5/sq mi (346.0/km2). The racial makeup of the CDP was 96.06% White, 0.89% African American, 0.07% Native American, 1.18% Asian, 0.82% from other races, and 0.98% from two or more races. Hispanic or Latino of any race were 3.93% of the population.

There were 3,222 households, out of which 33.8% had children under the age of 18 living with them, 60.0% were married couples living together, 8.8% had a female householder with no husband present, and 28.5% were non-families. 23.0% of all households were made up of individuals, and 11.4% had someone living alone who was 65 years of age or older. The average household size was 2.67 and the average family size was 3.20.

In the CDP, the population was spread out, with 25.6% under the age of 18, 5.3% from 18 to 24, 31.1% from 25 to 44, 25.0% from 45 to 64, and 13.0% who were 65 years of age or older. The median age was 38 years. For every 100 females, there were 91.4 males. For every 100 females age 18 and over, there were 88.0 males.

The median income for a household in the CDP was $74,861, and the median income for a family was $88,701. Males had a median income of $61,421 versus $40,247 for females. The per capita income for the CDP was $31,638. About 2.6% of families and 3.5% of the population were below the poverty line, including 1.4% of those under age 18 and 7.2% of those age 65 or over.

Emergency services

Fire safety
Fire protection in Bayport is provided by the Bayport Fire Department, a volunteer department located at 251 Snedecor Avenue on the corner of Railroad Street, which is part of the Suffolk County Fire Rescue and Emergency Services system with call numbers 3-14-0. Besides fire protection, the Bayport Fire Department also responds to auto accidents, rescue calls, water-related emergencies, hazardous materials incidents and a first response for high priority EMS calls such as cardiac arrests, choking, etc.

The Bayport Fire Department was organized on August 15, 1891, with 18 members under the name Bayport Hose Company. Charles R. Post was made Chief. A plot of land on the north side of Middle Road, next to Shands (Little Albert's) was purchased from I. S. Snedecor for $500 and a Fire House built for $3000. There was a belfry but this was removed in 1941. This building was sold to Arthur Shand, and a new firehouse was built on Snedecor Avenue and Railroad Street in 1956 where it stands today. In 1896 they bought a hook and ladder truck so heavy that there were not enough members to pull it to the fire. This also created the Hook and Ladder Company thus changing the name to the Bayport Fire Department.

Prior to World War II, a third company was created, Engine Company No.1; however, during WWII, the interdepartmental companies temporarily disbanded and were reestablished at the close of the war. In 1955 the Bayport Fire District purchased its first new fire truck, a 1955 Mack 750 GPM. In 1991 this vehicle was retired from active service and sold to the Bayport Fire Department for one dollar (US).  In 2006, the truck in its original condition went through a minor overhaul having its gold leaf replaced and intense cleaning. Today, the BFD has roughly 120 members, 70-85 active and has an average response time of four minutes.  Currently, there are four companies (Hose Company, Hook and Ladder Company, Engine Company and Fire Police Company) with two Squads (Rescue and Water Rescue).

In the 1800s fire departments typically had similar uniforms.  Black or navy blue pants, red wool shirt with black breast and white insignia and patent leather belts. Today, the Bayport Fire Department members continue to wear the original uniform and as far as they know are the only fire department in New York state that continues to do so (with the exception of the Brentwood Fire Department band).

Water Rescue Squad

Formed in 1991 by members of the department and companies, was created as the BFD Dive or SCUBA team specializing in mostly subsurface rescues and based on recreation diving adapted to rescues.  Early on, the team was one of the largest in Suffolk County based on certified divers. In 2000, the fire district purchased a 19' zodiac hurricane 580 rescue boat.  This was to be used in conjunction with the smaller 10' avon rescue boat which was not sufficient for offshore rescues in the Great South Bay.  Soon the department found their water rescue alarms went from about 1 or 2 per year to between 30 and 40.  Quickly the squad reorganized itself and started advanced training in Public Safety Diving, Surface Rescues and Ice Rescues with nationally recognized certifications.  In 2005 two major steps were taken with the squad: first, a new truck committee was established and a bid contract was awarded to Marion Body works of Wisconsin to build a specialized custom water rescue truck (which was delivered in May 2006), and second, the Zodiac was outfitted with a custom top, larger windshield, custom grab rails, radar, new GPS, new fire radios and new lighting.  With mutual aid plans, the response area of the water rescue team has grown to Patchogue Bay to the east to Heckscher State Park to the west and south to Fire Island.  In 2021 the Department placed a new Fire-Rescue boat in service.  A 30ft Endeavor custom built by Silver Ships in Alabama.  Powered by twin 350hp Mercury Verado outboards the vessel is equipped with A/C & heat, a fire pump with bow monitor, Raymarine radar/chart/sonar system & FLIR system.

Ambulance and others

EMS/Ambulance Service is provided by the Community Volunteer Ambulance Co. located in Sayville, which in addition to Sayville and Bayport covers the West Sayville, Bohemia and Oakdale communities. Police services are provided by the Suffolk County Police 5th Precinct.

Education
Bayport is served by the Bayport-Blue Point School District, which consists of a high school (Bayport-Blue Point High School), a middle school (James Wilson Young Middle School), and three elementary schools, Academy Street Elementary, Sylvan Avenue Elementary, and Blue Point Elementary.

Library
Bayport is served by the Bayport-Blue Point Public Library. The Bayport-Blue Point Public Library was founded in 1935 as project of the Blue Point Parent Teacher Association, as the Blue Point Public Library. When the Bayport and Blue Point school districts merged in 1952, the library officially became the Bayport-Blue Point Library, and it is a school district public library, overseen by the New York State Education Department. The library's collection began from donated books, with tradition stating that the donated books were gathered, home by home, via wheelbarrow. Today, the library's logo is a wheelbarrow containing books, paying homage to the institution's beginnings. The library was first contained in a room of the Blue Point School (now Blue Point Elementary School) before moving to various locations including the building what is now the Blue Point Liquor Store, and houses along Blue Point Avenue. In 1957 the current building was built at 203 Blue Point Avenue. Two additions to the building have made the building almost three times its original size. The library was completely run by volunteers up until 1970, making it one of the last volunteer-run libraries in New York State.

On December 6, 2018, voters in the Bayport-Blue Point School District approved the purchase of the St. Ursula Center at 186 Middle Road in Blue Point for $3.65 million, to become the future home of the Bayport-Blue Point Public Library. The convent, which had served as a novitiate, retreat center, and most recently a retirement home for the Ursuline Sisters of Tildonk, is scheduled to undergo a $13,197,800 renovation to convert the home into a 28,000 square foot public library with additional programs and collection space, state-of-the-art technology, an outdoor Community Garden, and more.

Aerodrome
Bayport is home to one of only a few remaining aerodromes on Long Island. The Bayport Aerodrome Society is a non-profit organization that was formed in 1972. Its membership is composed of aviation professionals and those interested in preserving aviation history. By offering tours of the Aerodrome and living museum, its members share their passion for aviation with the community.

In fiction 
This fictional town of Bayport in The Hardy Boys series of books and television show is loosely based on Bayport, New York.

Notable people 
Troy Donahue
Andrew Garbarino
Sal LoCascio
Lewis Smith Parks

References

External links

Islip (town), New York
Census-designated places in New York (state)
Hamlets in New York (state)
Census-designated places in Suffolk County, New York
Hamlets in Suffolk County, New York
Populated coastal places in New York (state)